Phuong "Kenny" Tran is a Vietnamese American professional poker player from Arcadia, California who won the 2008 World Series of Poker $10,000 Heads-Up No-Limit Hold'em World Championship. Tran was born in Vietnam and gives 10% of his winnings to his extended family there. He is married and has 3 children. He first began playing poker in 1992 at a bowling alley while working at McDonald's.

World Series of Poker 
He began playing tournaments in 1999 and has thirteen career World Series of Poker cashes. Tran made the final table of the $50,000 World Championship H.O.R.S.E. Event at the 2007 WSOP. He finished in 5th and won $444,000. In that same year he had his highest finish in the Main Event, finishing in 16th and earning $381,000. He also finished in 16th position in the inaugural World Series of Poker Europe Main Event, earning $68,000. At the 2008 World Series of Poker Tran won a bracelet in the $10,000 Heads-Up No-Limit Hold'em World Championship and his largest cash to date, earning $539,056.

Other poker events 
Tran is known as a cash game specialist who plays in high-stakes No Limit Seven Card Stud games at the Commerce Casino in Los Angeles. He also used to play online on Full Tilt Poker where he was a sponsored professional. He has four World Poker Tour (WPT) cashes including finishing in 10th place at the Sixth Annual Five Star World Poker Classic in the $25,000 No Limit Hold'em WPT World Championship, earning $158,290. As of 2009, his total winnings exceed $2,100,000. His 13 cashes at the WSOP account for $1,661,619 of those winnings.

References

External links
 
 

American poker players
Living people
Vietnamese poker players
American people of Vietnamese descent
World Series of Poker bracelet winners
People from Arcadia, California
Year of birth missing (living people)